The Tour of Arava is an annual professional road bicycle race for women in Israel.

Winners

References

Cycle races in Israel
Recurring sporting events established in 2016
Women's road bicycle races
Annual sporting events in Israel